The Maari oilfield is an oil reservoir located  off the coast of South Taranaki, New Zealand. Production of oil began in February 2009, and the field is expected to have a productive life of 10 to 15 years. The lead partner for the field is OMV New Zealand (69%), with other parties Horizon Oil (26%) and Cue Taranaki (5%).

See also 
 Energy in New Zealand
 Oil and gas industry in New Zealand

References 

Zealandia
Geography of Taranaki
Geography of the New Zealand seabed
Oil fields of New Zealand